The 2009 coral.co.uk Players Championship Finals was the inaugural edition of the PDC tournament, the Players Championship Finals, which saw the top 32 players from the 2008 PDC Players Championship Order of Merit taking part. The tournament took place between 30 January–1 February 2009 and was held at the Circus Tavern, Purfleet, England – the former venue of the PDC World Darts Championship.

Prize money
The 2009 Players Championship Finals featured a prize fund of £200,000.

Qualification
The top 32 players from the PDC Players Championship Order of Merit after the last Players Championship of 2008 qualified for the event.

Draw

Scores after player's names are three-dart averages (total points scored divided by darts thrown and multiplied by 3)

Statistics

Television Coverage
ITV4 screened live coverage of the tournament, becoming ITV's third televised tournament after the Grand Slam of Darts and the European Championship. Also, there was nightly highlights shown on ITV1. Again, Matt Smith presented the coverage, with analysis from Chris Mason (once he had lost to van der Voort) and Alan Warriner-Little, commentary from Mason, Stuart Pyke, John Rawling and Warriner-Little, and reports from Ned Boulting.

References

Players Championship Finals
Players Championship Finals
2009 in English sport
Sport in Essex
Purfleet
2000s in Essex